Plague is an 1898 painting in tempera by the Swiss symbolist artist Arnold Böcklin, held in the Kunstmuseum Basel. It exemplifies the artist's obsession with nightmares of war, pestilence and death. The painting shows Death riding on a bat-like winged creature, who travels through the street of a medieval European town.

Plague is rendered mostly using shades of pale green, a colour often associated with decomposition. The other predominant tones are black and dull browns; for example, in the clothes worn by the figures shown in the mid and background as they dive for safety before Death's path. The red cloth of the woman shown in the mid-foreground is the only vivid colour seen; she lies across the corpse of a woman who was cut down  also.

Sources
 Eco, Umberto. On Ugliness.  Rizzoli, 2007. 

1898 paintings
Symbolist paintings
Paintings in the collection of the Kunstmuseum Basel
Paintings by Arnold Böcklin
Epidemics in art
Paintings about death